The 1955 Mitropa Cup was the 15th season of the Mitropa football club tournament. It was won by Vörös Lobogó who beat ÚDA Praha in the two-legged final 8–1 on aggregate.

Preliminary round
Matches played between 29 June and 5 July 1955.

|}

1 Vörös Lobogó beat Wacker Wien 5–1 in a play-off to qualify for the Quarter-finals.

First leg

Second leg

Play-off

Quarter-finals
Matches played between 6 and 13 July 1955.

|}

First leg

Second leg

Semi-finals
Matches played between 18 and 23 July 1955.

|}

1 ÚDA Praha beat Slovan Bratislava 2–1 in a play-off to qualify for the Final.

First leg

Second leg

Final

|}

First leg

Second leg

See also
1955–56 European Cup

External links
1955 Mitropa Cup at Rec.Sport.Soccer Statistics Foundation

1955
1955–56 in European football
1955–56 in Italian football
1955–56 in Hungarian football
1955–56 in Yugoslav football
1955–56 in Austrian football
1955–56 in Czechoslovak football